Parka Posht or Parkaposht may refer to:
 Parka Posht-e Mehdikhani
 Parka Posht-e Yavarzadeh